Vakıf Museum is an ethnography museum in Ankara, Turkey exhibiting endowed articles.

The museum is on Atatürk Boulevard in Ankara. It is to the south of Melike Hatun Mosque and to the east of Gençlik Parkı, the largest park of Ankara. Some of the other museums of Ankara such as Stamp Museum, Ethnography Museum of Ankara and State Art and Sculpture Museum are nearby. The museum building was built as a school building. It is an example of First national architectural movement of Turkey. Between 1928 and 1941 it was used by the School of Law and after 1941, it was used as the Girls’ vocational school. In 2004 it was restored and on 7 May 2007 it was opened as a museum.

Exhibitions
Vakıf means "charitable foundation" and the museum is dedicated to ethnographic endowments. In the ground floor, rugs and carpets as well as various tools in carpet weaving are exhibited. In the upper floor, hand written books, tiles, metal and wooden items are on display. Relatively more recent items such as clocks and 19th-century cameras are also a part of the museum collection.

Gallery

External links
 100+ pictures

References

Museums in Altındağ, Ankara
2007 establishments in Turkey
Turkish culture
Museums established in 2007
Ethnographic museums in Turkey